The MTs255 is a Russian shotgun fed by a 5-round internal revolving cylinder. It is produced by the TsKIB SOO, Central Design and Research Bureau of Sporting and Hunting Arms.

The MTs255 is unique in that the forearm extends nearly all the way back to the cylinder. The shotgun is reloaded in a manner consistent with that of most modern revolvers, by unlocking the cylinder, and swinging it away from the frame to the left and down.

Variants 
 MTs255 (МЦ255) - civilian version, has a permanent wooden butt and fore-end. The guns are available in 12, 20, 28, and 32 gauge, and .410 bore. At present, it is not commercially available, only parts are available on request.
 MTs255-12 (МЦ255-12) - police version (for ammunition 12/70 and 12/76), designed for law enforcement and security agencies, is distinguished by accessories made of black plastic, folding stock and a "Picatinny rail" bar for attaching sighting devices.

Users 

  - is allowed as civilian hunting weapon
  - is allowed as civilian hunting weapon

See also
 Colt Revolving Rifle
 List of Russian weaponry

References

Sources 
 Виктор Зеленко, Вячеслав Трухачев. Ружьё МЦ 255 // журнал «Оружие», № 3, 2005. стр.56-58
 MC 255 // «Střelecká revue», 12, 2007

External links

МЦ255 Revolver-Type Shotguns - KBP Instrument Design Bureau
MTs-255 - TsKIB SOO
 M. R. Popenker. MTs-255 / "Modern Firearms"
 MTs-255 / Internet Movie Firearms Database

Revolver shotguns
Shotguns of Russia
TsKIB SOO products